Leslie Pickering Francis is an American philosopher, currently Distinguished Professor of Philosophy and Distinguished Professor of Law at University of Utah.

Francis holds joint appointments as Alfred C. Emery professor of law and professor of philosophy, and adjunct appointments in Family and Preventive Medicine (in the Division of Public Health), Internal Medicine (in the Program for Medical Ethics and Humanities), and Political Science, at the University of Utah. She was appointed to the rank of Distinguished Professor in 2009 and became director of the University of Utah Center for Law and Biomedical Sciences in 2015. Francis was President of the Pacific Division of the American Philosophical Association in 2015-2016. She served in the past as Vice President of the International Society for Philosophy of Law and Social Philosophy and as a member of the Ethics Committee of the American Society for Reproductive Medicine.  She also is past co-chair of the Privacy, Confidentiality, and Security Subcommittee of the National Committee on Vital and Health Statistics. Francis also has been a member of the Medicare Coverage Advisory Committee and of the American Bar Association's Commission on Law and Aging.

Francis is also a member of the Utah State Bar who provides pro bono representation to people who are the subject of petitions for guardianship.  She does this as a member of the signature program of the Utah State Courts which was created to ensure independent representation of individuals with disabilities.

Education
Wellesley College, Philosophy, 1963–67, B.A., 1967 (High Honors; Phi Beta Kappa)
University of Michigan, Philosophy, 1967–73, Ph.D., 1974
St. Hilda's College, Oxford 1971-73
University of Utah College of Law, J.D., 1981 (Order of the Coif)

Publications
Francis's books include The Patient as Victim and Vector: Ethics and Infectious Disease (co-authored with Battin, Jacobson, & Smith; Oxford University Press 2010; to be reissued with a new preface in 2020); Privacy: What Everyone Needs to Know (co-authored with John Francis; Oxford, 2017); and Sustaining Surveillance: the Ethics and Politics of Public Health Data Use (co-authored with John Francis; forthcoming Springer 2021). She edited the Oxford Handbook of Reproductive Ethics (Oxford, January 2017) and is the author of many papers in the areas of disability law and ethics, privacy and data use, justice, and bioethics.

References

Year of birth missing (living people)
Living people
University of Utah faculty
American philosophers
University of Michigan alumni
University of Utah alumni
Place of birth missing (living people)
American women philosophers
Wellesley College alumni
Alumni of St Hilda's College, Oxford
S.J. Quinney College of Law alumni
21st-century American women